Duaenhor was a Prince of Egypt. He was named after god Horus.

Family 
Duaenhor is thought by some to be a son of Crown Prince Kawab and Queen Hetepheres II. If so, he would have been a grandson of Pharaoh Khufu and Queen Meritites I. On the other hand, based on his titles, he may be one of the younger sons of Khufu (along with Khaemsekhem (G 7660), and Mindjedef (G 7760)).
 
Duaenhor's brothers were Kaemsekhem and Mindjedef. A daughter of Duaenhor was named Nebtyhotep. 

He held the titles King’s son of his body and Companion of his father.

Tomb 
Duaenhor was buried at Giza in mastaba G 7550. In the tomb his father and mother are mentioned. His daughter is also mentioned on the south entrance facade.

The scenes in the tomb show:
 (1) Duaenhor and his family
 (2) Table scene
 (3) Butchers at work
 (4) False door of Duaenhor

References

3rd-millennium BC births
3rd-millennium BC deaths
Princes of the Fourth Dynasty of Egypt